Gürsel Tekin (born 6 January 1964 in Ardahan, Turkey) is a Turkish politician of Kurdish descent and vice-president of Republican People's Party (CHP).

Biography 
Gürsel Tekin was born in Ardahan, Turkey. Tekin received his high school diploma from Kars Alparslan Lisesi (Kars Alparslan High School). Then he studied Turkish Literature Faculty at Atatürk University but he did not continue to school because of economic problems. Then he came to Istanbul for his military service.

Political career 
First he was the member of SODEP (Social Democracy Party). Then SODEP fused with HP to become SHP. In 1995 SHP and CHP came together. In 1999 Tekin became vice-mayor of Kadıköy and also in 1999 and 2004 he entered in Istanbul Municipality Council. Then in 2007 he became the provincial CHP chairman of Istanbul Province. Gürsel Tekin also worked with Kemal Kılıçdaroğlu on local elections in 2009. On 4 August 2010 he was chosen vice-president for the party.

References 

 Meclis üyesi Gürsel Tekin, İstanbul Büyükşehir Belediyesi
 Gürsel Tekin, CHP İstanbul İl Başkanlığı
 CHP İstanbul İl Başkanı Gürsel Tekin oldu, NetHaber
 Gürsel Tekin biyografisi, OKimdir.com

External links 

Contemporary Republican People's Party (Turkey) politicians
1964 births
Living people
Social Democracy Party (Turkey) politicians
20th-century Turkish politicians
Social Democratic Populist Party (Turkey) politicians
People from Ardahan
Members of the 25th Parliament of Turkey
Members of the 24th Parliament of Turkey
Members of the 26th Parliament of Turkey